James Joseph McDaid (born 3 October 1949) is a former Irish Fianna Fáil politician who served as a Teachta Dála (TD) for the Donegal North-East constituency from June 1989 until he resigned in November 2010. He also served as Minister for Tourism, Sport and Recreation between 1997 and 2002 and as Minister of State for Transport between 2002 and 2004.

McDaid has had a concurrent career as a medical doctor and continues to work as a general practitioner in Letterkenny.

Early life
McDaid was born in Termon in County Donegal. He was educated in St Eunan's College in Letterkenny between 1962 and 1967. He went on to attend University College Galway (UCG), and was conferred with a Bachelor of Medicine, Bachelor of Surgery in 1974. While at UCG he played on the university soccer team that won three national titles, with McDaid captaining the side on two of those occasions. He was Clubman of the Year Award winner in 1972–73.

Between 1974 and 1979 McDaid worked at Letterkenny General Hospital, and in 1979 he went into partnership as a general practitioner in Letterkenny. He was also involved as medical officer to the Donegal county Gaelic football team.

Political career
McDaid was elected to Dáil Éireann on his first attempt at the 1989 general election and he was re-elected at each subsequent general election until his retirement in 2010. He ousted sitting Fianna Fáil TD Hugh Conaghan, and, according to The Irish Times, was selected by the party to run against their own man due to Conaghan's opposition to the then Leader of Fianna Fáil Charles Haughey. He remained on the backbenches until 1991 when he was nominated by Taoiseach Charles Haughey to the position of Minister for Defence.  On the morning of his appointment, however, a photograph emerged taken outside Dublin's Four Courts on the day a judge ruled that the Maze Prison escaper, James Pius Clarke, should not be extradited to the United Kingdom. McDaid was seen in the background, smiling broadly. While McDaid stated that his presence at the hearing was due to personal connections – Clarke's mother was a constituent and a patient in his general practice in Letterkenny – the opposition Fine Gael party objected to his appointment and ministers from Fianna Fáil's coalition partners, the Progressive Democrats, indicated their unwillingness to remain in office should McDaid be appointed. McDaid handed back his portfolio that evening and returned to the backbenches.  Following Bertie Ahern's election as leader of Fianna Fáil in 1994, McDaid was appointed to the front bench as spokesperson on Equality and Law Reform.

McDaid joined the government in 1997 when he became Minister for Tourism, Sport and Recreation. During his tenure he earned the nickname the "Minister for Fun", however, he presided over much more weighty issues such as investigations into controversial events such as drugs allegations in sport and sex abuse by swimming coaches. Following the 2002 general election McDaid failed to retain his Cabinet post, but he did become a Minister of State.  He was an unsuccessful candidate for the North-West constituency at the 2004 European Parliament election and was later sacked from his position as Minister of State and returned to the backbenches once again.

In April 2006, McDaid announced that he would be retiring from public life in favour of returning to his medical practice and would not be standing in the next general election and that politics "no longer held any challenge for him". However, on 27 July 2006, following the announcement that Independent Fianna Fáil TD Niall Blaney had joined the Fianna Fáil party, McDaid reversed this decision, and announced that he would be seeking nomination as a candidate to contest the 2007 general election.

Following the absorption of Independent Fianna Fáil and its sole TD, Niall Blaney into Fianna Fáil, there were then three outgoing Fianna Fáil TDs in this very competitive three-seater constituency. Under the Single transferable vote proportional representation electoral system used in Ireland, it was considered virtually impossible for all three to be elected. Fianna Fáil's Cecilia Keaveney lost her seat to the Fine Gael candidate Joe McHugh, with McDaid and Blaney being the two successful Fianna Fáil candidates.

McDaid told the Irish Independent on 1 June 2007 that he had received no help from Fianna Fáil headquarters during the general election campaign and that the party had treated him as a virtual independent. He warned that, consequently, the party should not take his support in the 30th Dáil for granted. This threat was followed through in November 2008 when he abstained from a vote on the Cervical cancer vaccination programme, resulting in his expulsion from the Fianna Fáil parliamentary party.

In April 2010, he said he would not be voluntarily giving up his ministerial pension of €22,487, despite most other TDs and Senators having done so. He said he would not do so "unless it is the express wish of Dáil Éireann". The next month it was revealed that he missed more than four out of every five Dáil votes in 2009 – by far the worst record of any TD.

McDaid resigned from his Dáil seat on 2 November 2010. In his resignation letter, he called for a general election before December 2010 and also accused the Government of taking political soft options and not tackling the real issues.

Personal life
McDaid's private life has long been a source of interest in the Irish media. The breakdown of his marriage, and the subsequent publication of a book by his ex-wife, revealed the details of their troubled marriage and separation. He is divorced from his first wife Marguerite, with whom he had three sons and a daughter.

In April 2005, McDaid was arrested when found driving drunk in the wrong direction on a dual carriageway outside Dublin.  Oncoming vehicles were forced to swerve to avoid his car, which was eventually forced to stop when a haulier blocked his path. Tests showed a blood alcohol level of 267 mg, more than three times over the legal limit of 80 mg.  He was subsequently convicted of dangerous driving while intoxicated and drunken driving, banned from driving for 2 years and fined €750. However he was returned his licence after only a year. The case attracted media attention and McDaid was described as 'a disgrace' and 'an idiot'. He acknowledged that these descriptions were accurate, and stated that he was genuinely sorry for his actions.

Three years earlier, as junior Transport Minister in November 2002, he had spearheaded the Government's anti-drink driving campaign, warning that 'some drivers still choose to ignore our drink driving laws, and as a result innocent lives are destroyed'.

He lives with his second wife, Siobhán and the couple's son.

References

1949 births
Living people
Alumni of the University of Galway
Fianna Fáil TDs
Gaelic games players from County Donegal
Members of the 26th Dáil
Members of the 27th Dáil
Members of the 28th Dáil
Members of the 29th Dáil
Members of the 30th Dáil
Ministers of State of the 29th Dáil
People educated at St Eunan's College
Politicians from County Donegal
20th-century Irish medical doctors
21st-century Irish medical doctors